Melissa Greeff (born 15 April 1994) is a South African-Canadian chess Woman Grandmaster (WGM). She earned the WGM title in 2009.

Biography
In 2007, in Windhoek, Melissa ranked 5th in the African Women's Chess Championship. In 2009, she played for South Africa in the World Girls' Junior Chess Championship and ranked 35th place. Later on in the same year, she won the African Women's Chess Championship in Tripoli.
In 2010, she participated in the Women's World Chess Championship by knock-out system and in the first round lost to Humpy Koneru. In 2011, in Maputo, she ranked 4th in African Women's Chess Championship.

Melissa Greeff played for South Africa:
 in the Women's Chess Olympiad participated 3 times (2008-2012);
 in the All-Africa Games chess tournament participated in 2007 and won team silver medal.

In 2007, she was awarded the FIDE Woman International Master (WIM) title and then received the FIDE Woman Grandmaster (WGM) title two years later.

In 2011, she became a FIDE Instructor.

Since 2014, she has rarely played in chess tournaments. Melissa moved to Canada where she studied robotics and engineering at the University of Toronto. She had worked with Dr. Angela P. Schoellig on vision-based path-following controllers for UAVs during GPS-denied flight. She has since worked on several other aspects of robotics, engineering, and mathematics. Since 2019, she teaches first-year linear algebra at the University of Toronto.

References

External links
 
 
 

1994 births
Living people
Sportspeople from Cape Town
South African female chess players
Chess woman grandmasters
Chess Olympiad competitors
African Games medalists in chess
University of Toronto alumni
Competitors at the 2007 All-Africa Games
African Games silver medalists for South Africa